is a Japanese screenwriter. She is known for her screenplays in both the live-action and anime mediums. Her 1995 screenplay for Gakkō no kaidan was nominated for the Japan Academy Prize. She is best known for her collaborations with anime director Mamoru Hosoda.

Career
A graduate of the Literature Department of Tokai University in Tokyo, Okudera did not originally consider a career in screenwriting. Instead, she worked for an oil company until 1991, after which she quit her job and became a full-time writer. After over a decade of work in live-action film and television, Okudera was offered her first animation project: adapting Yasutaka Tsutsui's novel Toki o Kakeru Shōjo for director Mamoru Hosoda. The resulting film, The Girl Who Leapt Through Time, received worldwide acclaim and gave her international recognition upon its release in 2006. Okudera again collaborated with Hosoda on the 2009 film Summer Wars. At the 2009 Anime Festival Asia in Singapore, Hosoda revealed Okudera would be writing the script for his next project, Wolf Children.

Awards
Japan Academy Prize Best Screenplay - Gakkō no Kaidan (1995) winner
Mainichi Film Concours Screenwriting Award - Ohikkoshi (1993)  winner
Tokyo Anime Awards Best Screenplay - The Girl Who Leapt Through Time (2006)  winner, Summer Wars (2009)  winner
Yokohama Film Festival Best Screenplay - Shaberedomo shaberedomo (2007) winner, Kaidan (2007)  winner

Works
Ohikkoshi (1993)
Yoi ko to asobô (1994)
Gakkō no Kaidan (1995)
Gakkō no Kaidan 2 (1996)
Gakkō no Kaidan 4 (1999)
Konsento (2001)
Makai Tenshō (2003)
Hana (2003)
OLDK. (2004)
Tenshi (2006)
The Girl Who Leapt Through Time (2006)
Kaidan (2007)
Miyori no Mori (2007)
Shaberedomo shaberedomo (2007)
Summer Wars (2009)
Permanent Nobara (2010)
Youkame no semi (2011)
Keibetsu (2011)
The Princess and the Pilot (2011)
Wolf Children (2012)
Kiki's Delivery Service (2014)
Watashi, Teiji de Kaerimasu (2019)

References

External links
 
 
 Satoko Okudera anime at Media Arts Database 

1966 births
Living people
Tokai University alumni
Japanese screenwriters
Anime screenwriters